Yakorra is a village in West Papua, Indonesia. The village is located in the southern Bird's Head Peninsula.

References

Populated places in West Papua